Vexillum collinsoni is a species of small sea snail, marine gastropod mollusk in the family Costellariidae, the ribbed miters.

Description
The length of the shell varies between 10 mm and 16 mm.

The shell is whitish, stained with brown at the apex, obscurely banded with bluish ash a little below the
top of the whorls, and spotted irregularly with brown in the same part, generally between the ribs. The lower half of the body whorl is cinereous brown.

Distribution
This marine species occurs off Japan, the Philippines, Papua New Guinea and Hawaii; in the Indian Ocean off Mozambique.

References

 Higo, S., Callomon, P. & Goto, Y. (1999) Catalogue and Bibliography of the Marine Shell-Bearing Mollusca of Japan. Elle Scientific Publications, Yao, Japan, 749 pp.

External links
 Adams, A. (1864). On the species of Mitridae found in the Seas of Japan. Journal of the Proceedings of the Linnean Society, Zoology. 7: 198-201

collinsoni
Gastropods described in 1864